Two human polls comprised the 1966 NCAA University Division football rankings. Unlike most sports, college football's governing body, the NCAA, does not bestow a national championship, instead that title is bestowed by one or more different polling agencies. There are two main weekly polls that begin in the preseason—the AP Poll and the Coaches Poll.

Legend

AP Poll
The final AP Poll was released in early December, at the end of the 1966 regular season. In the previous season, the final poll was released in January for the first time, after the bowl games, but not in 1966 or 1967.

The AP Poll ranked only the top ten teams from 1962 through 1967.

Final Coaches Poll
The final UPI Coaches Poll was released prior to the bowl games, in late November.Notre Dame received twenty of the 35 first-place votes; Michigan State received ten, Alabama four, and UCLA one.

Notre Dame did not participate in bowl games from 1925 through 1968.
 Prior to the 1975 season, the Big Ten and Pac-8 conferences allowed only one postseason participant each, for the Rose Bowl.
Big Ten champion Michigan State was barred from participation in the Rose Bowl due to the conference's no-repeat rule, in effect from 1946 through 1971.
 The Ivy League has prohibited its members from participating in postseason football since the league was officially formed in 1954.

References

College football rankings